was a former Japanese football player. He played for Japan national team.

Club career
Yuguchi was born in Osaka on July 4, 1945. After graduating from Kansai University, he joined his local club Yanmar Diesel in 1968. The club won the league champions in 1971. The club also won 1968 and 1970 Emperor's Cup. He retired in 1972. He played 66 games and scored 3 goals in the league.

National team career
In October 1968, Yuguchi was selected Japan national team for 1968 Summer Olympics in Mexico City. At this competition, on October 18, he played against Spain and Japan won Bronze Medal. In 2018, this team was selected Japan Football Hall of Fame. He also played at 1970 World Cup qualification and 1970 Asian Games. He played 5 games and scored 1 goal for Japan until 1970.

On February 2, 2003, Yuguchi died of stomach cancer in Nara at the age of 57.

National team statistics

Awards
 Japan Soccer League Fighting Spirit Award: 1968

References

External links

 
 Japan National Football Team Database
Japan Football Hall of Fame (Japan team at 1968 Olympics) at Japan Football Association

1945 births
2003 deaths
Kansai University alumni
Association football people from Osaka Prefecture
Sportspeople from Osaka
Japanese footballers
Japan international footballers
Japan Soccer League players
Cerezo Osaka players
Olympic footballers of Japan
Olympic medalists in football
Olympic bronze medalists for Japan
Medalists at the 1968 Summer Olympics
Footballers at the 1968 Summer Olympics
Footballers at the 1970 Asian Games
Association football midfielders
Asian Games competitors for Japan